The 1998–99 Weber State Wildcats men's basketball team represented Weber State College during the 1998–99 NCAA Division I men's basketball season. Members of the Big Sky Conference, the Wildcats were led by eighth-year head coach Ron Abegglen and played their home games on campus at Dee Events Center in Ogden, Utah.

Junior Eddie Gill was named MVP of the conference tournament.

Seeded 14th in the West region, Weber State met No. 3 seed North Carolina in the first round at KeyArena in Seattle. The Wildcats stunned the Tar Heels, winning 76–74 and becoming the first school to win two first-round games in the NCAA Tournament as a No. 14 seed. In the second, Weber State pushed the Florida Gators to OT before losing 82–74.

Junior forward Harold Arceneaux was named Big Sky Player of the Year. Arceneaux would be named conference player of the year for a second time after his senior season (1999–2000).

Postseason result

|-
!colspan=6 style=| Big Sky tournament

|-
!colspan=6 style=| NCAA tournament

References

External links
Sports Reference – Weber State Wildcats: 1998–99 basketball season

Weber State Wildcats men's basketball seasons
Weber State
Weber State